The Communist Party of South Sudan (Hizb Al-Shuyu'i Janub Al-Sudan) is a communist party in South Sudan. It was formed in June 2011, as the southern branches of the Sudanese Communist Party separated themselves from their mother party ahead of South Sudanese independence. The formation of the new party was declared at a meeting at the Sudanese Communist Party office in Khartoum. Joseph Wol Modesto is the general secretary of the party.

The party participated in the 2013 International Communist Seminar in Brussels.

See also
Sudanese Communist Party

References

External links

Communism in South Sudan
Communist parties in Africa
Political parties in South Sudan
Political parties established in 2011